The 1980 winners of the Torneo di Viareggio (in English, the Viareggio Tournament, officially the Viareggio Cup World Football Tournament Coppa Carnevale), the annual youth football tournament held in Viareggio, Tuscany, are listed below.

Format
The 16 teams are seeded in 4 groups. Each team from a group meets the others in a single tie. The winner of each group progress to the final knockout stage.

Participating teams
Italian teams

  Avellino
  Fiorentina
  Juventus
  Lazio
  Milan
  Napoli
  Perugia
  Torino
  Udinese

European teams

  Real Madrid
  Aris Thessaloniki
  Partizan Beograd
  First Vienna
  Celtic
  Dukla Praha
  Porto

American teams
  River Plate

Group stage

Group A

Group B

Group C

Group D

Knockout stage

Champions

Footnotes

External links
 Official Site (Italian)
 Results on RSSSF.com

1980
1979–80 in Italian football
1979–80 in Yugoslav football
1979–80 in Greek football
1979–80 in Portuguese football
1979–80 in Czechoslovak football
1979–80 in Scottish football
1979–80 in Austrian football
1980 in Argentine football
1979–80 in Spanish football